Páramos, also known as "Sedano y Las Loras", is a comarca located northwest of the province of Burgos in the autonomous community of Castile and León. It is bounded on the north-east by the Merindades, north-west by Cantabria, west by the Province of Palencia, and in the south by the Alfoz de Burgos and Odra-Pisuerga comarcas.

Administrative Entities 
Municipalities and villages:
Sargentes de la Lora
 Ayoluengo
 Moradillo del Castillo
 San Andrés de Montearados
 Santa Coloma del Rudrón
 Valdeajos
Basconcillos del Tozo (El Tozo)
 Arcellares
 Barrio Panizares
 Fuente Úrbel
 Hoyos del Tozo
 La Piedra
La Rad
 Prádanos del Tozo
 San Mamés de Abar
 Talamillo del Tozo
 Trasahedo
Sedano
 Cortiguera
 Cubillo del Butrón
 Escalada
 Gredilla de Sedano
 Moradillo de Sedano
 Nidáguila
 Nocedo
 Orbaneja del Castillo
 Pesquera de Ebro
 Quintanaloma
 Quintanilla Escalada
 Terradillos de Sedano
 Turzo
 Valdelateja
Valle del Rudrón
 Tubilla del Agua
 Bañuelos del Rudrón
 Covanera
 San Felices del Rudrón
 Tablada del Rudrón
Rebolledo de la Torre
 Albacastro
 Castrecias
 La Rebolleda
 Valtierra de Albacastro
 Villela
Valle de Valdelucio
 Barrio-Lucio
 Corralejo
 Escuderos
 Fuentecaliente de Lucio
 Llanillo
 Mundilla
Paul
 Pedrosa de Valdelucio
 Quintanas de Valdelucio
 Renedo de La Escalera
 Riba de Valdelucio
 Solanas de Valdelucio
 Villaescobedo
Humada
 Congosto
 Fuencaliente de Puerta
 Fuenteodra
 Los Ordejones
 Ordejón de Abajo
 Ordejón de Arriba
 Rebolledo de Traspeña
 San Martín de Humada
 Villamartín de Villadiego
Úrbel del Castillo
 La Nuez de Arriba
 Quintana del Pino

Geography

History

See also
 Province of Burgos
 Valle del Rudrón

References

External links 
 website of the Province of Burgos delegation

Province of Burgos
Comarcas of the Province of Burgos